Casiogrammus is an extinct genus of millipede in the family Zosterogrammidae. There is one described species in Casiogrammus, C. ichthyeros.

References

Millipedes
Millipedes of North America
Articles created by Qbugbot